King's Quest (video game) may refer to:

 King's Quest I, a 1984 video game
 King's Quest (2015 video game)